Quincy Delight Jones III (born 23 December 1968), better known as QDIII, QD3 and Snoopy, is an English-born Swedish-American music producer and film producer.

Family
Jones was born in Wimbledon, London, the son of Swedish model Ulla Andersson and American musician-music producer Quincy Jones Jr. He grew up in Sweden with his older sister Martina after their parents legally separated. The two have five American half-sisters by their father's two other marriages and relationships in the United States, including the actresses Kidada and Rashida Jones and fashion model Kenya Kinski-Jones.

Career
Jones is the founder of QD3 Entertainment, which has produced a series of documentaries known collectively as Beef. These explore the violence and feuds within hip hop culture. Jones is also a hip hop DJ; he released an album called Soundlab (1991).

On 4 November 2009, Chamillionaire launched the Global Innovation Tournament 2009 with Jones at Stanford University as part of the Stanford Entrepreneurial Thought Leaders Seminar Series.

Jones is known for his documentary The Carter (2009), about rapper Lil Wayne. Lil Wayne filed a lawsuit to prevent distribution because he wanted control over the final cut, but the case was dismissed by the judge. A Huffington Post review ranked it as one of the top five movies about hip-hop.

In 2011, Jones co-founded the health and wellness lifestyle company Feel Rich, Inc. with partner Shawn Ullman, which aimed at promoting "health as the new wealth" to urban communities. Along with QD3's father, Grammy winning producer Quincy Jones, they produced a documentary film, Feel Rich:Health is the New Wealth, that featured celebrities, hip hop icons, and medical and health professionals discussing wellness in the urban community.

In January 2014, Jones founded WeMash, an Internet service that connects owners of content (movie studios, news organizations, sports entities, music labels/publishers) with creators from every field (video artists, filmmakers, musicians, and more) to reimagine content beyond its original context. Investors include venture capital firm Andreessen Horowitz.

Jones was a jury member of Swedish Idol 2016.

Discography

Solo albums
1991: Soundlab (Qwest/Reprise/Warner Bros. Records 26574) featuring Justin Warfield

Films and documentaries
1987: Stockholmsnatt as Quincy. Also narrating.
2002: The Freshest Kids: A History of the B-Boy (as producer, QD3 Entertainment)
2006: Beef: The Series (QD3 Entertainment)
Beef (4 October 2006)
Beef II (11 October 2006)
Beef III (16 October 2006)
Beef IV (25 October 2006)
Beef V (1 November 2006)
Beef VI (8 November 2006)
The Carter (2009)
Beef: Behind the Bullet (9 February 2011)
Tupac: Thug Angel (2011)

Bibliography
Q, The Autobiography of Quincy Jones

References

External links

QD3 Entertainment - Official website

1968 births
Living people
American hip hop DJs
American hip hop record producers
American people of Cameroonian descent
American people of Swedish descent
American people of Welsh descent
Grammy Award winners for rap music
Musicians from London
Family of Quincy Jones
Qwest Records artists
Musicians from Stockholm
People from Wimbledon, London
Swedish hip hop DJs
Swedish people of African-American descent
Swedish people of Welsh descent
Swedish people of Cameroonian descent
Swedish record producers
Berklee College of Music alumni